Paragomphus nyasicus is a species of dragonfly in the family Gomphidae. It is found in Malawi and possibly Zimbabwe. Its natural habitat is freshwater lakes. It is threatened by habitat loss.

References

Gomphidae
Taxonomy articles created by Polbot
Insects described in 1955